Blas Marcelo Cristaldo González (born 9 December 1964) is a retired association football defender and coach from Paraguay. He played professional football in Paraguay for Cerro Porteño and have been coaching the inferior squads of Cerro Porteño for some years now. Even he was interim coach several times in the first division. Currently as an assistant coach on the national team of Paraguay for Brazil 2014.

International 
Cristaldo made his international debut for the Paraguay national football team on 14 June 1991 in a Copa Paz de Chaco match against Bolivia (0-1 win). He obtained a total number of seven international caps, including the 1991 Copa America in Chile scoring no goals for the national side. And also played in Peru, the team Sipesa for 1 year (1993)

External links

1964 births
Living people
Paraguayan footballers
Paraguay international footballers
Association football central defenders
Cerro Porteño players
1991 Copa América players